Aranyakanda ( Jungle Chapter) is a 1986 Telugu-language action thriller film produced by C. Penchal Reddy under the Ushodaya Enterprises banner, and directed by Kranthi Kumar. It stars Nagarjuna, Ashwini, Rajendra Prasad. The soundtrack is composed by Chakravarthy.

Plot
The entire story revolves around a forest where the protection of a tribe against a tiger and deadly gangsters by a forest officer Chaitanya. Chaitanya goes to the jungle to solve the case of the tiger-killing the local tribals. There, he meets the love birds Sanga and Neeli, but they cannot marry due to caste problem. After going through the case, Chaitanya realises that the tiger is not harming the people, but there are some cowardly people who are doing all this. The rest of the story forms how he eradicates the evil activities and what he has to pay for them.

Cast
Nagarjuna as Chaitanya
Ashwini as Preethi
Rajendra Prasad as Sangadu
Charan Raj as Bukutha
Prabhakar Reddy as Preethi's father
Rallapalli as Chinna Bukutha
P. J. Sarma as DFO
Bob Christo as Rowdy
Raadhika as Poornima
Annapurna as Chaitanya's mother
Tulasi as Neeli
Sri Lakshmi as Chinna Dorasani

Soundtrack

The music was composed by Chakravarthy. Lyrics were written by Veturi. The music released on SAPTASWAR Audio Company.

References

External links

1987 films
Indian action thriller films
Films based on Indian novels
Films scored by K. Chakravarthy
1980s Telugu-language films
Films directed by Kranthi Kumar
1980s action thriller films